The northern chestnut-tailed antbird (Sciaphylax castanea) is a species of bird in the family Thamnophilidae. It is found in the Amazon Rainforest in northeastern Peru and far eastern Ecuador.

The northern chestnut-tailed antbird was originally described by the American ornithologist John Zimmer in 1932 as a subspecies of the southern chestnut-tailed antbird with the trinomial name Myrmeciza hemimelaena castanea. A molecular phylogenetic study published in 2013 found that the genus Myrmeciza, as then defined, was polyphyletic. In the resulting rearrangement to create monophyletic genera the northern chestnut-tailed antbird  and the southern chestnut-tailed antbird were moved to a newly erected genus Sciaphylax.

References

northern chestnut-tailed antbird
Birds of the Ecuadorian Amazon
Birds of the Peruvian Amazon
northern chestnut-tailed antbird
northern chestnut-tailed antbird
Taxonomy articles created by Polbot